Moss End is a hamlet in Berkshire, England, within the civil parish of Warfield.

Hamlets in Berkshire
Warfield